Michael McNulty is a politician.

Michael McNulty may also refer to:
Mike McNulty (boxing manager) (1887–1965)
Matthew McNulty, né Michael McNulty, actor
Michael Barnes McNulty, character in The Wire
Michael McNulty, writer of Waco: The Rules of Engagement